
This is a list of players who graduated from the Challenge Tour in 2019. The top 15 players on the Challenge Tour rankings in 2019 earned European Tour cards for 2020.

* European Tour rookie in 2020
† First-time member ineligible for Rookie of the Year award
T = Tied
 The player retained full European Tour status for 2022 (finished inside the top 121 in 2021).
 The player retained category 16 European Tour status for 2022 (finished outside the top 121 in 2021).

Due to the effects of the COVID-19 pandemic on the 2020 European Tour season, all of the graduates retained the same status in 2021 except Rozner, who was promoted to the winners category after his victory at the 2020 Golf in Dubai Championship.

In 2021, European Tour Qualifying School was cancelled for a second straight year, limiting the normal changes in European Tour membership between seasons. The 2019 Challenge Tour graduates that failed to finish in the top 121 of the Race to Dubai were placed in a category immediately below the 2021 Challenge Tour graduates for the 2022 European Tour season, approximately equal to the category usually given to qualifying school graduates.

Wins on the European Tour in 2020 and 2021

Runner-up finishes on the European Tour in 2020 and 2021

See also
2019 European Tour Qualifying School graduates

References

Challenge Tour
European Tour
Challenge Tour Graduates
Challenge Tour Graduates